Thomas Scott House is a Greek Revival plantation house located north of Louisiana Highway 5, about  east of Gloster in DeSoto Parish, Louisiana.

Built in 1858, the mansion has a pedimented two-story entrance portico with Doric posts and pilasters. At the time of its NRHP nomination it was in somewhat deteriorated condition.

The house was listed on the National Register of Historic Places on November 6, 1986.

See also
National Register of Historic Places listings in DeSoto Parish, Louisiana

References

Houses on the National Register of Historic Places in Louisiana
Houses completed in 1858
Houses in DeSoto Parish, Louisiana
National Register of Historic Places in DeSoto Parish, Louisiana